Benjamin Tasker may refer to:
 Benjamin Tasker Sr. (1690–1768), Provincial Governor of Maryland (1752–1753)
 Benjamin Tasker Jr. (1720–1760), Maryland politician, delegate to the Albany Congress, racehorse owner

See also
 Tasker